Abdollahabad-e Ojaq (also Romanized as ‘Abdollāhābād-e Ojāq; also known as ‘Abdollāhābād-e Reẕā’īyeh) is a village in Kahrizak Rural District, Kahrizak District, Ray County, Tehran Province, Iran. At the 2006 census, its population was 25, in 7 families.

References 

Populated places in Ray County, Iran